The Central Military Region is one of the five military regions of the Egyptian Armed Forces and is headquartered in Cairo.

Structure 
The current structure of the Central Military Region:

HQ, Central Military Region: Heliopolis, Greater Cairo

 Field HQ, Heliopolis, Central Military Region
 Field HQ, El Qanater, Central Military Region
 Sub-Field HQ, Tanta, Central Military Region
 Sub-Field HQ, Zagazig, Central Military Region
 Field HQ, Qom Ushim, El Fayum, Central Military Region
 Field HQ, Beni Suef, Central Military Region

It contains the following units:

 2nd Mechanised Division (Highkestep, Cairo)
 120th Mechanized Infantry Brigade
 4th Mechanized Infantry Brigade
 56th Armored Brigade
 51st Med. Range Artillery Brigade
 9th Armoured Division (Dahshur, southwest of Giza)
 71st Armored Brigade
 72nd Armored Brigade
 90th Mechanized Infantry Brigade
 44th Med. Range Artillery Brigade
 23rd Independent Armored Brigade 
 Two Engineer Brigades 
 Two Long Range Artillery Brigades 
 9th Reconnaissance Battalion 
 10th Drone Reconnaissance Battalion

References 

Military regions of Egypt
Cairo